Boehmeria australis is a critically endangered large shrub species in the plant family Urticaceae. It is endemic to small islands of Australia and New Zealand.

Subspecies
Boehmeria australis subsp. australis — endemic to Norfolk Island. In 2003 only about 33 mature plants were known, but it has been propagated and planted to increase numbers. Plants grow rapidly and have a short lifespan.  
Boehmeria australis subsp. dealbata  — Kermadec Nettle ; occurs in the Raoul and Kermadec Islands and a closely related species is at 
Boehmeria australis — another subspecies is endemic to Lord Howe Island.

References

External links

affinis
Flora of Lord Howe Island
Flora of Norfolk Island
Flora of the Kermadec Islands
Endemic flora of Australia
Endemic flora of New Zealand